The Women's madison competition at the 2017 World Championships was held on 15 April 2017.

Results
120 laps (30 km) with 12 sprints were raced.

References

Women's madison
UCI Track Cycling World Championships – Women's madison